Marc Laidlaw (born August 3, 1960) is an American novelist and video game writer. He is a former writer for the video game company Valve, where he worked on the Half-Life series before his departure in 2016. He has published several novels.

Biography
Laidlaw was born and raised in Laguna Beach, California. He attended the University of Oregon, where he tried, and was discouraged by, punched card computer programming.  He wrote short stories and his first novel, Dad's Nuke, was published in 1985.  This was followed by several more novels over the next decade, while working as a legal secretary in San Francisco.

Laidlaw had played computer and arcade games, but was not intrigued until he played Myst (1993).  He obsessed over Myst and bought a new computer so that he could play it. He wrote The Third Force (1996), a tie-in novel based on the world created by the Gadget computer game.

Valve 
Laidlaw joined the video game company Valve while they were developing their first game, the first-person shooter (FPS) Half-Life (1998). He was originally hired to work on another game, Prospero, but switched when Prospero was canceled and the Half-Life project expanded. 

Laidlaw said his contribution was to add "old storytelling tricks" to the team's ambitious designs. Rather than dictate narrative elements "from some kind of ivory tower of authorial inspiration", he worked with the team to improvise ideas and was inspired by their experiments. He contributed to the "visual grammar" of the level design, and focused on "doing storytelling with the architecture ... The narrative had to be baked into the corridors."

For Half-Life 2 (2004), the team developed the characterization. Laidlaw created family relationships between the characters, saying it was a "basic dramatic unit everyone understands" that was rarely used in games. Laidlaw also worked on Half-Life 2: Episode One (2006) and Half-Life 2: Episode Two (2007), plus several canceled Half-Life projects, including a virtual reality game, Borealis.

Departure from Valve 
Laidlaw announced his departure from Valve in January 2016. He said the primary reason for his departure was his age, and planned to return to writing stories. Laidlaw later said he had tired of the FPS form and of solving the problems of storytelling in a Half-Life-style narrative; he said he had "always hoped that we'd stumble into a more expansive vocabulary or grammar for storytelling within the FPS medium, one that would let you do more than shoot or push buttons, or push crates".

On August 25, 2017, Laidlaw published a short story titled "Epistle 3", describing it as "a snapshot of a dream I had many years ago". Journalists interpreted it as a summary of what could have been the plot for the canceled game Half-Life 2: Episode Three, though Laidlaw later denied this. In 2023, Laidlaw said he regretted publishing the story. He said he had been "deranged" and "completely out of touch", and that publishing the story had created problems for his former colleagues at Valve. Valve released a new Half-Life game, Half-Life: Alyx, in 2020. As of 2023, Laidlaw had not played it and said: "I don't ever need to see another Combine soldier again, not even in VR."

In 2018, Laidlaw completed a new novel, Underneath the Oversea, but could not find a publisher and self-published it on Kindle "to zero notice". He said he had the publishing world had "forgotten who he was" and that his age prevented publishers from building a new audience.

Personal life 
In 2003, Laidlaw said his favorite games included The Legend of Zelda, Animal Crossing, Castlevania: Symphony of the Night, Ico, Fatal Frame and Thief: The Dark Project. After leaving Valve, Laidlaw moved to Kauai, Hawaii. He has an amateur radio license and his call sign is WH6FXC.

Bibliography

Novels
 
 
 Kalifornia (1993)
 The Orchid Eater (1994)
 The Third Force (1996), Gadget game tie-in
 The 37th Mandala (1996), nominated for the 1997 World Fantasy Award and awarded the 1996 International Horror Guild Award
 White Spawn (2015)
 Under the Oversea (2018)

Short fiction 

Stories

The Bard Gorlen series
"Catamounts" (September 1996, The Magazine of Fantasy and Science Fiction)
"Childrun" (August 2008, The Magazine of Fantasy and Science Fiction)
"Quickstone" (March 2009, The Magazine of Fantasy and Science Fiction)
"Bemused" (September/October 2013, The Magazine of Fantasy and Science Fiction)
"Rooksnight" (May/June 2014, The Magazine of Fantasy and Science Fiction)
"Catamounts" (Reprint) (August 2013, Lightspeed)
"Belweather" (September 2013, Lightspeed)
"Stillborne" (November/December 2017, The Magazine of Fantasy and Science Fiction)
"Weeper" (September/October 2020, The Magazine of Fantasy and Science Fiction)
"Underneath the Oversea" (November 2020)
———————
Notes

Games

References

External links
 
 

1960 births
Living people
20th-century American male writers
20th-century American novelists
20th-century American short story writers
21st-century American male writers
21st-century American novelists
21st-century American short story writers
American male novelists
American male short story writers
American science fiction writers
Asimov's Science Fiction people
The Magazine of Fantasy & Science Fiction people
Novelists from California
People from Laguna Beach, California
University of Oregon alumni
Valve Corporation people
Video game writers
Weird fiction writers